Fliflet is a surname. Notable people with the surname include:

Albert Lange Fliflet (1908–2001), Norwegian philologist and translator
Arne Fliflet (born 1946), Norwegian jurist and civil servant
Elise Fliflet (1893–1991), Norwegian politician
Gabriel Fliflet (born 1958), Norwegian accordion player and vocalist